The Don Ho Show was a daytime variety program aired by ABC between 1976 and 1977, hosted by entertainer Don Ho.

The variety show, which ran for 90 episodes in a five-month run, featured guest appearances from celebrities, including Lucille Ball, Tony Bennett, and Redd Foxx, as well as singing, comedy, and audience participation.

References

External links

1976 American television series debuts
1977 American television series endings
1970s American musical comedy television series
1970s American variety television series